Intermission: The Singles Collection is a greatest hits album by Amanda Marshall.

Track listing
 "Let It Rain" (Hall)
 "Birmingham" (McTaggart, O'Brien, Tyson)
 "Dark Horse" (Marshall, McTaggart, Tyson)
 "Beautiful Goodbye" (Tyson, Ward)
 "Fall from Grace" (Bullard, Jordan)
 "Sitting on Top of the World" (Marshall)
 "Believe in You" (Marshall, Eric Bazilian)
 "Love Lift Me" (Marshall, Bettis, Cantor, Bazilian)
 "If I Didn't Have You" (Marshall, Bazilian)
 "Shades of Grey" (Marshall, Bazilian)
 "Everybody's Got a Story" (Marshall, Mann, Molecules)
 "Sunday Morning After" (Marshall, Mann, Asher, Molecules)
 "Double Agent" (Marshall, Mann, Asher, Molecules)
 "Marry Me" (Marshall, Misener)
 "Cross My Heart" (Marshall, Misener)
 "Until We Fall In" (Marshall, Misener)

2003 greatest hits albums
Amanda Marshall albums
Albums produced by Don Was
Albums produced by Peter Asher
Sony Music Canada compilation albums